Mark Flowerdew (born 4 June 1971) is an English former professional snooker player.

Career

Flowerdew turned professional in 1991, and reached at least the last 32 stage of six ranking events in his career. His most notable performance was a run to the quarter-finals of the 1995 Welsh Open, where he defeated Joe O'Boye 5–4, Rom Surin of Thailand 5–1, Les Dodd 5–2, Alain Robidoux 5–2, Michael Judge 5–4 and Antony Bolsover 5–3 before losing 3–5 to the eventual winner, Steve Davis.

Flowerdew's showing in the Welsh Open improved his ranking to 50th in the world, a position he held for a year, but having dropped to 63rd at the end of the 1996–1997 season, he did not play a match following his 5–10 loss to Nick Pearce in qualifying for the 1997 World Championship, and thereafter lost his professional status.

References

English snooker players
1971 births
Living people